Jonathan's Coffee House was a significant meeting place in London in the 17th and 18th centuries, famous as the original site of the London Stock Exchange. 
 
The coffee house was opened around 1680 by Jonathan Miles in Change (or Exchange) Alley, in the City of London. In 1696, several patrons were implicated in a plot to assassinate William III, and it was thought to be associated with the Popish Plots.

In 1698, it was used by John Castaing to post the prices of stocks and commodities, the first evidence of systematic exchange of securities in London. That year, dealers expelled from the Royal Exchange for rowdiness migrated to Jonathan's (as well as to Garraway's Coffee-House).

It was the scene of a number of critical events in the history of share trading, including the South Sea Bubble and the panic of 1745. It was destroyed by fire in 1748, and rebuilt. In 1761 a club of 150 brokers and jobbers was formed to trade stocks. The club built its own building in 1773 in Sweeting's Alley, which was dubbed the New Jonathan's, but was renamed the Stock Exchange (now officially called the London Stock Exchange).

The original Jonathan's served as the home of a lottery office until it was destroyed by fire in 1748.

See also 
 Lloyd's of London
 Coffeehouse

External links 
 Jonathan's, The Edwin C. Bolles Collection, Tufts University
 Map: The Business World of London's Exchange Alley, c. 1746
 History of London Stock Exchange 
 Stringham, Edward Peter. 2002. “The Emergence of the London Stock Exchange as a Self-Policing Club.” Journal of Private Enterprise, 17(2) Spring: 1-19.

Coffeehouses and cafés in London
Former buildings and structures in the City of London
17th-century establishments in England
17th century in London
18th century in London
London Stock Exchange